The Benin national badminton team represents Benin in international team competitions. The team is controlled by the Badminton Federation of Benin (French: Federation Beninoise de Badminton; FBB). The Beninese mixed team competed in the 2019 African Badminton Championships.

The men's team debuted in the All Africa Men's and Women's Team Badminton Championships in 2022. Benin has yet to compete in a women's team tournament.

Participation in BCA competitions 

Men's team

Mixed team

Current squad 

Men
Preferet Adomahou
Carlos Charles Ahouangassi
Oswald Ash Fano-Dosh
Carlos Miguel Codjo Kpanou

Women
Adjele Joeline Degbey
Xena Arisa
Pascaline Ludoskine Yeno Vitou

References 

Badminton
National badminton teams
Badminton in Benin